Robert Canterbury Buford (born 1960) is an American basketball executive, currently CEO of the San Antonio Spurs of the National Basketball Association (NBA). He was named general manager in 2002 after five seasons serving as team president. Buford is also the president of sports franchises for Spurs Sports & Entertainment. Buford has won the NBA Executive of the Year award twice, for the 2013–14 and 2015–16 seasons, before his promotion to CEO before the start of the 2019–20 season.

Early career
Buford played college basketball at Oklahoma State and Texas A&M, though he had a limited career. He received his degree from Friends University. Prior to joining the Spurs in 1988, Buford spent five seasons at the University of Kansas and was a member of the coaching staff when the Jayhawks won the 1988 NCAA Championship.

NBA executive career
Buford first joined the Spurs in the summer of 1988 as an assistant coach on Larry Brown's staff. He spent four seasons as an assistant with the Spurs, including the 1989–90 and 1990–91 seasons when the team captured back-to-back Midwest Division titles. In the summer of 1992, he became the number-one assistant for Brown with the Los Angeles Clippers. He spent one season with the Clippers before moving to the University of Florida for the 1993–94 season.

Spurs general manager Gregg Popovich then hired Buford as the Spurs' head scout in the summer of 1994 and he has been with the team since that time. In the summer of 1997 he was named the Spurs' director of scouting, and then two years later in 1999 was promoted to the position of assistant general manager. He was named general manager in 2002.

Buford has won five NBA championships with the Spurs (1999, 2003, 2005, 2007, 2014), four as general manager (2003, 2005, 2007, 2014).

Buford won the 2013–14 NBA Basketball Executive of the Year award on May 7, 2014, and later won the same honor for the 2015–16 season.

On July 23, 2019, the Spurs announced Buford will be promoted from general manager to CEO for the Spurs, effective September 3. His previous role will be filled by assistant general manager Brian Wright.

Personal life
His son Chase played basketball for the Kansas Jayhawks and now is the head coach of the NBL team, the Sydney Kings. His daughter C.C., who played golf for the College of Charleston, now coaches at East Carolina University.

References

External links
 General Managers
 Spurs promote R.C. Buford to senior vice president

1960 births
Living people
Friends University alumni
Kansas Jayhawks men's basketball coaches
Los Angeles Clippers assistant coaches
National Basketball Association general managers
Oklahoma State Cowboys basketball players
San Antonio Spurs assistant coaches
San Antonio Spurs executives
Texas A&M Aggies men's basketball players
American men's basketball players